Alexander Robert Taylor (February 28, 1947 – March 12, 1993) was an American singer.

Alexander Taylor was the eldest child of Gertrude and  Isaac M. Taylor. He was a member of a family which produced a number of musicians, the most famous of whom is James Taylor, as well as Livingston, Hugh, and Kate Taylor.

Alex Taylor had two sons, Edward and James. The elder son, Edward was adopted, and lives in North Carolina; his second son James, who resides on Martha's Vineyard, is the namesake of Alex's brother James, and inspired his uncle's 1970 hit "Sweet Baby James." Alex Taylor traveled around Florida gigging and recording his finest work at a little studio in Tampa called Progressive Music. Taylor suffered a heart attack on March 7, 1993, in Sanford, Florida, while recording a third album at King Snake Records Studio. He died on March 12, 1993 (James's birthday), at age 46.  He was survived by his wife Brent B. Taylor, then age 46, of West Tisbury; his two sons; and granddaughters Caroline, Anna Kate, Paige, and Claudia.

According to the official Rolling Stone biography of James Taylor, Alex Taylor's death has been attributed to alcoholism. Livingston Taylor has said in an interview that Taylor suddenly stopped breathing while sleeping in a Kingsnake Records studio and that this occurred shortly after Taylor downed almost an entire bottle of vodka ("what was for him... not an exceptional amount of booze"). James Taylor wrote his song "Enough To Be On Your Way" with Alex's funeral in mind then changed some of the details to commemorate a fictional "Alice".

Livingston Taylor called him "generous to the very fiber of his soul" and "the greatest older brother ever." Livingston also said that Alex supported and protected him during his troubled childhood.

Discography
 With Friends and Neighbors (1971)
 Dinnertime (1972)
 Third for Music (1974)
 Live at the Horseshoe Tavern (1984) with Dan Aykroyd & the East Coast Funkbusters starring Barbara Holliday, Buck Taylor, Bird Taylor, Paul Shafer and the entire Blues Brothers Band.
 Voodoo in Me (1989)
 Dancing with the Devil (1991)

References

External links
Noel Coppage's review of Dinnertime (Archived 2009-10-25)

Singers from Massachusetts
1947 births
1993 deaths
James Taylor
20th-century American singers
Taylor family (show business)
Alcohol-related deaths in Florida
20th-century American male singers